Stal Mielec is a Polish football club based in Mielec, Poland. The club was established on April 10, 1939. Historically, the club has enjoyed great successes within Poland's Ekstraklasa, winning the title twice (in 1973 and 1976) but had undergone significant management changes and financial difficulties within the past two decades, which forced the club from participation in the Poland's top league. After winning the third-tier II liga title in 2016, Stal Mielec was promoted to I liga. After finishing first in I liga in 2020, Stal Mielec was promoted to the Ekstraklasa for the first time since the 1995–96 season.

History

Naming history
 1939 – Klub Sportowy PZL Mielec
 1946 – Robotniczy Klub Sportowy PZL Zryw Mielec
 1948 – Związkowy Klub Sportowy Metalowców PZL Mielec
 1949 – Związkowy Klub Sportowy Stal Mielec
 1950 – Koło Sportowe Stal przy Wytwórni Sprzętu Komunikacyjnego Mielec
 1957 – Fabryczny Klub Sportowy Stal Mielec
 1977 – Fabryczny Klub Sportowy PZL Stal Mielec
 1995 – Autonomiczna Sekcja Piłki Nożnej FKS PZL Stal Mielec
 1997 – Mielecki Klub Piłkarski Stal Mielec
 1998 – Mielecki Klub Piłkarski Lobo Stal Mielec
 1999 – Mielecki Klub Piłkarski Stal Mielec
 2002 – Klub Sportowy Stal Mielec
 2003 – Klub Sportowy FKS Stal Mielec

1939–1945 - the beginning and interwar period
The football club was one of the first two (next to the volleyball club) at the PZL Mielec, established in 1939. The team was made up of players playing in other clubs in Mielec and employees of the PZL, an aerospace company. In the first match played, the team defeated the Gymnastic Society "Sokół" Mielec with 4–1 victory. Three more matches were played against Dzikovia Tarnobrzeg (2–1), Metal Tarnów (3–1) and a team made up of players from an ammunition factory in Nowa Dęba (6–1). The match against Okęcie Warszawa planned for September did not take place, because World War II started and any sports games were forbidden. However, the matches were played illegally in the meadows beyond the communal forest and in other towns (including Dębica, Kolbuszowa, Sandomierz). The only official match was played against a German military unit and ended with the score 1–2.

Achievements
Ekstraklasa
 1st place: 1972–73, 1975–76
 2nd place: 1974–75
 3rd place: 1973–74, 1978–79, 1981–82
Polish Cup
Finalists: 1976
Youth Teams:
Polish U-19 runners-up: 1964, 2007
 Polish U-19 bronze medalists: 1968, 1969, 2006
 Polish U-17 champions: 2007
 Polish U-17 runners-up: 1996, 2012

Participation in European cups

 Quarter-finalists of the UEFA Cup in the 1975–76 season.
 First round participants of the UEFA Cup in the 1979–80 season.
 First round participants of the UEFA Cup in the 1982–83 season.
 First round participants of the European Champions Cup in the 1973–74 season.
 First round participants of the European Champions Cup in the 1976–77 season.

Lower League Championships
 I liga: 1960, 1984–85, 1987–88
 II liga: 1955, 1968–69, 2015–16
 III liga: 2012–13
 V liga: 1998–99
 Klasa A: 1950, 1954
 Klasa B: 1949

Stadium

The construction of the club's current stadium, Stadion Miejski w Mielcu, was concluded in 1953. The stadium underwent a major renovation, completed in 2013. It maintains a seating capacity for 7,000 spectators. Before the 2013 renovation, it maintained seating capacity for 30,000 spectators, and hosted numerous European Champions Cup, UEFA Cup, and Poland national team matches, including FIFA World Cup and UEFA European Championship qualifiers.

Individual Player Awards

Ekstraklasa Top Goalscorer
 1973 - Grzegorz Lato - 13 goals
 1975 - Grzegorz Lato - 19 goals
 1995 - Bogusław Cygan - 16 goals

Award given by Piłka Nożna:

 Player of the Year
 1976 - Henryk Kasperczak
 1977 - Grzegorz Lato
 Newcomer of the Year
 1975 - Zbigniew Hnatio
 1978 - Włodzimierz Ciołek

Award given by Przegląd Sportowy

 Polish Athlete of the Year
 1974 - 4th place - Grzegorz Lato
 1977 - 5th place - Grzegorz Lato

Award given by Sport

 Player of the Year
 1974 - Grzegorz Lato
 1976 - Henryk Kasperczak
 1977 - Grzegorz Lato

Award given by Tempo

 Goalkeeper of the Year
 1979 - Zygmunt Kukla

Reserves

The club operates a reserve team which currently plays in IV liga Subcarpathia, the fifth tier of the league pyramid. Moreover, there is the Stal Mielec III team, as they play in liga okręgowa (sixth tier) and participate in the 2020–21 Subcarpathian Rzeszów–Dębica Polish Cup edition.

Current squad

Other players under contract

Out on loan

Notable players
 Grzegorz Lato, player of Poland national football team, Golden Shoe winner of the 1974 World Cup with 7 goals; former President of the Polish Football Association
 Henryk Kasperczak, player of Poland national football team, former coach of Wisła Kraków and Kavala F.C.
 Andrzej Szarmach, player of Poland national football team
 Jan Domarski, player of Poland national football team
 Dariusz Kubicki, player of Poland national football team
 Zygmunt Kukla, goalkeeper of Poland national football team (1978–1980)
 Bogusław Wyparło, goalkeeper of Poland national football team
 Edgar Bernhardt, player of Kyrgyzstan national football team

Managers

 Stanisław Maurer (1947–1948) 
 Rudolf Pirych (1948–1952)
 Eustachy Poticha (1952–1953)  
 Antoni Brzeżańczyk (1954–1956)
 Michał Matyas (1957–1958) 
 Antoni Brzeżańczyk (1959–1960) 
 Henryk Skromny (1961) 
 Czesław Suszczyk (1962)
 Michał Matyas (1962–1963) 
 Stanisław Malczyk (1963–1964) 
 Otton Opiełka (1964) 
 Władysław Lemiszko (1964–1965) 
 Konrad Jędryka (1966–1967) 
 Andrzej Gajewski (1968–1972)
 Károly Kontha (1973)
 Aleksander Brożyniak (1973–1974)
 Zenon Książek (1974–1975)
 Edmund Zientara (1975–1977)
 Alfred Gazda (1977)
 Konstanty Pawlikaniec (1977–1978)
 Zenon Książek (1978–1980)
 Mieczysław Kruk (1980–1981)
 Józef Walczak (1981–1982)
 Witold Karaś (1982) 
 Jacek Machciński and Marian Kosiński (1982–1983)
 Henryk Stroniarz (1983–1984)
 Włodzimierz Gąsior (1984–1985)
 Ryszard Latawiec (1985–1986)
 Zenon Książek (1986–1987)
 Włodzimierz Gąsior (1987–1990)
 Marian Kosiński (1990)
 Włodzimierz Gąsior (1990–1991)
 Grzegorz Lato (1991–1993)
 Witold Karaś (1993)
 Franciszek Smuda (1993–1995)
 Jan Złomańczuk (1995)
 Grzegorz Lato (1996–1997)
 Jerzy Płaneta (1998)
 Marek Chamielec (1999)
 Jerzy Płaneta (1999–2000)
 Witold Karaś (2000)
 Roman Gruszecki (2000–2001)
 Włodzimierz Gąsior (2001)
 Marek Lorenc  (2001)
 Krzysztof Łętocha (2001–2002)
 Jacek Klisiewicz (2002)
 Włodzimierz Gąsior (2003–2006)
 Tomasz Tułacz (2006)
 Włodzimierz Gąsior (2006–2007)
 Janusz Białek (2007)
 Zbigniew Hariasz (2007)
 Andrzej Jaskot (2008)
 Grzegorz Wcisło (2008–2009)
 Zbigniew Hariasz (2009)
 Janusz Białek (2009)
 Zbigniew Hariasz (2009–2010)
 Grzegorz Wcisło (2010)
 Mariusz Łuc (2010)
 Tomasz Tułacz (2011–2012)
 Roman Gruszecki (2012)
 Włodzimierz Gąsior (2012–2014)
 Rafał Wójcik (2014)
 Janusz Białek (2014)
 Rafał Wójcik (2014)
 Janusz Białek (2014–2016)
 Maciej Serafiński (2016)
 Zbigniew Smółka (2016–2018)
 Artur Skowronek (2018–2019)
 Dariusz Marzec (2019–2020)
 Dariusz Skrzypczak (2020)
 Leszek Ojrzyński (2020–2021)
 Włodzimierz Gąsior (2021)
 Adam Majewski (2021–2023)
 Kamil Kiereś (2023–)

See also

 Football in Poland
 List of football teams
 Champions' Cup/League
 UEFA Cup

References

External links

 [ Official website]
 Stal Mielec at the 90minut.pl website (Polish)

 
Mielec
Association football clubs established in 1939
1939 establishments in Poland